Zhu Changxun (1586–1641) was the third son of the Ming dynasty Wanli Emperor. His mother, Noble Consort Zheng, was a favoured concubine and, in efforts to please her, the emperor attempted to have Zhu made heir apparent, but failed to overturn the rule of primogeniture. After the fall of the Ming, however, Zhu's son, Zhu Yousong, became emperor of the Southern Ming.

Biography
Zhu Changxun was born in 1586 to Noble Consort Zheng. He was her third child and the third son of the Chinese Wanli Emperor.

He was made Prince of Fu (福) in 1601. He was married in August 1604, for which his father levied taxes to fund the celebrations and wedding gifts. His first son, Yousong, was born to a concubine and enfeoffed as Prince of Dechang (德昌) in 1613. He moved his household to Luoyang in 1614, when he governed Henan as a fiefdom.

Zhu was killed in 1641 during an uprising led by Li Zicheng. After his soldiers fell to Li's army, Zhu fled to Ying'en Temple with his eldest son. Whilst Zhu was captured, his son managed to escape. The next day, Zhu was executed in front of a large crowd, presided over by Li Zicheng, at Zhougong Temple. Reports claim that Zhu was killed, then his body boiled with that of a deer to make stew, and his flesh was eaten by Li Zicheng and his soldiers. A memorial stone erected by the Hongguang Emperor states that his body was interred near Mt. Mang (邙), but was moved to Nanjing later on.

Succession dispute
In 1586, the Wanli Emperor decreed that Zhu's mother should be given the title of Imperial Noble Consort. However, this met with much opposition, as the mother of the emperor's eldest son was only referred to as Consort. The emperor's actions were perceived as the precursor to declaring Zhu heir apparent, instead of his elder brother, Zhu Changluo. The emperor's advisers argued that, if Zheng were to be made Imperial Noble Consort, then the emperor should simultaneously elevate Gong to Noble Consort. Over the next decade, advisers also attempted to persuade the emperor that abandoning the tradition of primogeniture had made Zheng the object of anger and disgust, not only in the court, but also across the country.

Finally, the emperor declared his eldest son heir apparent in 1601 and gave Zhu Changxun the title Prince of Fu. However, Zhu was not made to leave the imperial court in keeping with tradition until 1614, when he moved his household to Luoyang.

Family
Consorts
 Lady Yao (姚氏) or Tian (田氏), the primary consort and mother of Zhu Yousong. Posthumously honoured as "Empress Dowager Xiaocheng Duanhui Cishun Zhenmu" (孝誠端惠慈順貞穆皇太后) by Zhu Yousong, Zhu Youlang changed the posthumous title to "Empress Xiaocheng Duanhui Cishun Zhenmu Futian Dusheng Gong" (孝誠端惠慈順貞穆符天篤聖恭皇后)
 Lady Zou (鄒氏) the primary consort. Honoured as Empress Dowager with the title Empress Dowager Kezhen Renshou (恪貞仁壽皇太后) by Zhu Yousong
Issues:
 Zhu Yousong succeeded the title of Prince of Fu, later enthroned as the Hongguang Emperor of Southern Ming by Lady Yao
 Zhu Youju (朱由榘) (26 July 1609 - 1618), held the commandery princely title under the title Comm. Prince of Yingshang (潁上郡王). Later posthumously bestowed as "Prince Chong of Ying" (潁沖王) by Zhu Yousong
 Zhu Youhua (朱由樺), held the commandery princely title under the title Comm. Prince of Dechang (德昌郡王). Later posthumously bestowed as "Prince Huai of De" (德懷王) by Zhu Yousong

References

Citations

Works cited

1586 births
1641 deaths
Ming dynasty imperial princes
17th-century executions by China
Executed Ming dynasty people
Executed people from Beijing
Cannibalised people
Sons of emperors